Karen Sheffield Heney (born 7 April 1961) is a Canadian retired judoka and coach who won three medals at the Pan American Judo Championships between 1982 and 1986. Sheffield was Canadian Champion 10 times, has taught judo for over 25 years and represented Canada at the 1980 World Judo Championships, in New York City, United States, the first edition of this competition to allow women.

See also
 Judo in Canada

References

External links
 Munster Judo Club

1961 births
Canadian female judoka
Living people
Sportspeople from Toronto